Julius Timothy Flock (May 11, 1924 – March 31, 1998) was an American stock car racer.  He was a two-time NASCAR series champion. He was a brother to NASCAR's second female driver Ethel Mobley and Bob and Fonty Flock.

NASCAR career

Tim Flock finished 5th in NASCAR's inaugural Strictly Stock race at Charlotte, North Carolina in 1949; he drove an Oldsmobile 88 that he borrowed from his newlywed neighbors. NASCAR's first official season ended with Flock in eighth, his brother Fonty Flock in fifth, and his other brother Bob Flock in third in the overall points standings. 

Flock won his first official NASCAR race in 1950 at Charlotte. He ran 12 of 19 races and finished 16th in the final standings. In 1951, Flock won seven races. 1952 brought eight wins and four poles. At the end of the 1952 NASCAR season, Flock had 106 more points than Herb Thomas, earning Flock his first NASCAR Grand National Championship title, despite flipping in the final race at West Palm Beach. Flock later joked, "I was the only driver to ever win a championship upside-down." In 1954, Flock was disqualified despite winning at the Daytona Beach and Road Course for illegally screwed carburetor screws.

Flock had a rhesus monkey co-driver named "Jocko Flocko" with him in his May 16, 1953, Grand National win at Hickory Motor Speedway. Jocko Flocko became the only winning monkey ever. The monkey was retired two weeks later at Raleigh, where the monkey pulled the device to allow the driver to observe the right front tire and was hit by a pebble. At the time, drivers used a device to lift the wheel well to observe tire wear in case of a tire failure. Flock had to do a pit stop to remove the monkey, and he finished third (he would have won without the problem).

1955 was a record-setting year for Flock as well as NASCAR. On the way to Flock's second Grand National Championship title, Flock had 19 poles and 18 victories in 45 races. The 18 victories stood as a record until broken by "The King", Richard Petty, in 1967. The 19 poles are still the highest number in a NASCAR season.

The 1956 season saw Flock win the first NASCAR Cup event ever held at Road America. Flock followed points leader and pole-sitter Buck Baker for much of the start until many of the leaders began exiting for various problems, allowing Flock to lead the final ten laps. No other stock car events of any type were held at the track until the 1990s, and in 2010 the NASCAR Nationwide Series began racing there. Despite the win, however, the year was filled with off-track frustration for Flock, particularly with team owner Carl Kiekhaefer. Despite their combined on-track success, Flock left Kiekhaefer's team immediately after his victory in the April 8 race at North Wilkesboro Speedway, citing stomach ulcers. Upon departing from the Kiekhaefer camp, he had compiled 21 triumphs out of his 46 starts with Kiekhaefer.

Labor union
In his final race before "retiring" Flock was disqualified and banned from NASCAR as a result of "having too much solder on his carburetor screw" which was illegal. This was widely known by the public to be retaliation by NASCAR management for Flock's support of a NASCAR driver's union. Like Curtis Turner, he faced a life ban from NASCAR. Flock continued to race under other sanctioning bodies, including the Midwest Association for Race Cars, competing in the  event on the dirt at Lakewood Speedway, Georgia, in October 1961, where he finished second. He also raced at a United States Auto Club event in Concord, North Carolina, in 1963.

Flock was employed by the Ford Motor Company to entertain customers at track events. He was reinstated to NASCAR competition in 1966.

Later years
In 1959, he was hired by Charlotte Motor Speedway to work in various roles, including public relations and ticket sales.

His last race was the Battle of the NASCAR Legends race at Charlotte Motor Speedway in 1991. The race featured such drivers as Cale Yarborough, Junior Johnson, Pete Hamilton, and Donnie Allison. He finished 10th out of 22 drivers.

Death
Flock died of liver and throat cancer on March 31, 1998, six weeks before his 74th birthday, during NASCAR's 50th anniversary season. Darrell Waltrip honored him in a special paint scheme named "Tim Flock Special" at Darlington Raceway weeks before Flock died. Flock was without medical insurance, and Waltrip wanted to help raise money for Flock and his family.

A month before his death, Flock was honored as one of NASCAR's 50 Greatest Drivers. He has been inducted in numerous halls of fame, including the: International Motorsports Hall of Fame (1991), Motorsports Hall of Fame of America (1999), National Motorsports Press Association Hall of Fame (1972), State of Georgia Hall of Fame (1972), and Charlotte Motor Speedway Court of Legends (1994). He was inducted in the Alabama Sports Hall of Fame in May 2006. On May 22, 2013, Flock was named a member of the NASCAR Hall of Fame for 2014, to be inducted during Acceleration Weekend in January.

Motorsports career results

NASCAR
(key) (Bold – Pole position awarded by qualifying time. Italics – Pole position earned by points standings or practice time. * – Most laps led. ** – All laps led.)

Grand National Series

Daytona 500

See also
Fireball Roberts

References

External links
Official website
Go NASCAR Go: Tim Flock

1924 births
1998 deaths
People from Fort Payne, Alabama
Racing drivers from Alabama
NASCAR drivers
NASCAR Cup Series champions
International Motorsports Hall of Fame inductees
Deaths from cancer in North Carolina
Deaths from liver cancer
Deaths from throat cancer
Burials in North Carolina
Flock family
NASCAR Hall of Fame inductees